Sami Antero Järvi (born in 1970), better known by his pen name Sam Lake ('Järvi' is Finnish for lake), is a Finnish video game writer. He is the creative director at Remedy Entertainment, known for his writing (as well as his likeness) on the popular Max Payne video game series (in which a photo of his face was used as Max Payne's face), and Alan Wake.

Career

Lake attended University of Helsinki studying English literature around 1995. He was introduced to video games through a long-time friend Petri Järvilehto, one of the early members of Remedy Entertainment. Remedy was developing their first game Death Rally and needed text for the game, and Järvilehto asked Lake, one of the few people Remedy knew in writing, to help. Lake accepted the offer, and has since remained with Remedy.

Max Payne 
Lake played several roles in the development of Max Payne. He wrote the game's story and script and helped design levels. Because of the game's budget, Remedy could not hire actors. As a result, Lake, along with other Remedy programmers, artists and staff played the roles. Lake became the face model for the title character and he even got his mother to portray Nicole Horne, the game's main antagonist, whereas his father played Alfred Woden.

In the sequel, Max Payne 2: The Fall of Max Payne, the expanded budget meant Lake could stick to writing. The game's script ended up being about four times as long as some movie scripts. For the sequel, the budget increase allowed the team to hire professional actors to model for the graphic novel cutscenes and Lake was subsequently replaced by actor Timothy Gibbs. However, if the player should watch any of the TV set shows during the game, they will see that Lake models for various characters in Max Payne's meta, in TV shows and billboards, such as John Mirra in the television show Address Unknown as well as "Lord Valentine" and "Mama" in Lords and Ladies, and, finally, "Dick Justice" in Dick Justice. There is also an unofficial mod to give the character his old face back.

The ending theme song, "Late Goodbye" which appears in various points of the game, often sung by in game characters, is based on a poem by Lake. The song was written by the Finnish group Poets of the Fall.

Mob boss Vinnie Gognitti remarks that the creator of Max Payne's in-game cartoon series, Captain Baseball Bat Boy, is a man named Sammy Waters, which is a play on the name Sam Lake.

In the Max Payne movie which was released in 2008, Sam Lake also provided some writing help, though mostly for the character background.

Alan Wake
Lake was the lead writer for the 2010 "psychological action thriller" Alan Wake, which went on to receive numerous awards and a positive critical reception for its characters and story.

Lake cameos in the game as himself during a fictional in-game interview where he appears as a guest on a talk show along with the title character. As the interview wraps up the talk show host asks Lake to 'make the face', and Lake then mimics the infamous 'Max Payne' look from the original Max Payne videogame.

The game also features references to his earlier work with Max Payne when the player is allowed to read a few pages from the protagonist's novel The Sudden Stop. When opened, the pages are voiced by James McCaffrey, the voice of Max Payne, and makes clear references to the previous games such as the troubled character's murdered wife and baby, as well as his abuse of painkillers.

Works

References

External links

Payne & Redemption – An Independent Film Based On The Works Of Sam Lake
Sam Lake interviewed about Alan Wake

1970 births
Finnish writers
Living people
Video game writers
People from Helsinki